The West Frisian Islands are a chain of islands in the North Sea off the Dutch coast, along the edge of the Wadden Sea. They continue further east as the German East Frisian Islands and are part of the Frisian Islands.

From west to east the islands are: Noorderhaaks, Texel, Vlieland, Richel, Griend, Terschelling, Ameland, Rif, Engelsmanplaat, Schiermonnikoog, Simonszand, Rottumerplaat, Rottumeroog, and Zuiderduintjes.

The islands Noorderhaaks and Texel are part of the province of North Holland. The islands Vlieland, Richel, Griend, Terschelling, Ameland, Rif, Engelsmanplaat, and Schiermonnikoog are part of the province of Friesland. The small islands Simonszand, Rottumerplaat, Rottumeroog, and Zuiderduintjes belong to the province of Groningen.

The Frisian Islands are nowadays mostly famous as a holiday destination. Island hopping is possible by regular ferries from the mainland and by specialised tour operators. Cycling is the most favourable means of transport on most of the islands. On Vlieland and Schiermonnikoog cars are allowed only for regular inhabitants.

Geography
The island chain represents the remains of a glacially formed sandbank, and may have once been the former coastline of Holland, before it was breached and flooded to form the Waddenzee many thousands of years ago.

See also
List of lighthouses in Friesland

References

External links 

 
Islands of the Netherlands
Frisian Islands